The Lakeside Leisure Complex is a hotel, conferencing, entertainment and associated leisure complex in Frimley Green in west Surrey. It hosted in January the open/men's and women's BDO World Darts Championship from 1986 to 2019.

History

The complex was established in 1972, when Bob Potter (born 1928) bought Wharfenden House and the surrounding grounds and lake. He soon doubled the hall to 1,000 seats principally for hosting comedians and musicians, including North American and internationally acclaimed acts. The Lakeside had a fire later that decade and re-opened.

During the 25th year of hosting the World Darts Championship, in 2010 the lake had largely iced over by 7 January. That day the body of a man, a hotel guest for the competition week, was found. Landowner-managers, Bob Potter Leisure Limited, were fined £85,000 for health and safety violations.

Events
The Lakeside became the venue of the World Darts Championship in 1986, The Club sponsored the event from 2004 to 2019. It has hosted the new WDF World Darts Championship since 2022.

The venue has hosted acts such as Tommy Cooper, Morecambe and Wise, Sammy Davis Jr, Frankie Vaughan and Bob Monkhouse.

The 'Small Business Bureau Conference', held in 1987, was claimed by the organisers to be the largest business conference in Europe.

Facilities
Grand venue
The largest venue is the Main Cabaret Suite which has a capacity of 1,170 with conference and banqueting facilities.

Others
the Canal Suite (capacity 350)
the State Suite (capacity 100)
Bob's Bar
the Sharman Suite
the Wine Bar

It is a mixed members' club, hotel and selection of restaurants with snooker, pool, darts, ten-pin bowling, squash, bars, an events nightclub and well-equipped gym. Near the village, boats can be hired for day trips along the Basingstoke Canal. The borough and adjoining Wentworth/Sunningdale area has a number of golf courses.

Heyday as a club
Darts commentator and personality Sid Waddell looked back on the early darts era when Lakeside was "arguably the best club in Britain":
Tom Jones, Jim Davidson and other stars packed the joint, while Margaret Thatcher herself said it was one of her favourite places for Tory jollies."

Potter claims that he and his facilities inspired Peter Kay's comedic business saga Phoenix Nights, whose character is named Brian Potter.

References

External links
 

Tourist attractions in Surrey
Hotels in Surrey
Sports venues in Surrey
Frimley Green
Darts venues
Event venues established in 1972
1972 establishments in England
Lakes of Surrey